Peniophora cinerea is a species of fungus in the family Peniophoraceae. It is a plant pathogen infecting black walnut (Juglans nigra).

It was first described as a species of Corticium by Christiaan Hendrik Persoon in 1797. Mordecai Cubitt Cooke transferred it to Peniophora in 1879.

It is found in Asia and North America.

See also
 List of black walnut diseases

References

Fungi described in 1794
Fungi of Asia
Fungi of Europe
Fungal tree pathogens and diseases
Nut tree diseases
Russulales
Taxa named by Christiaan Hendrik Persoon